Ishiba may refer to
Ishiba Station, a train station in Shiga Prefecture, Japan
Shigeru Ishiba (born 1957), a Japanese politician
Lake Ishiba Ng'andu, a lake in Zambia